The Grey Nuns Community Hospital is an acute care hospital located in the Mill Woods area of south Edmonton, Alberta, Canada. The Grey Nuns Community Hospital provides a full range of services including a 24-hour Emergency Department. The 14-bed tertiary palliative care unit is known for its delivery of care and teaching practices. The hospital traces its roots to the Grey Nuns of Montreal who sent Sister Emery (Zoe LeBlanc), Adel Lamy and Alphonse (Marie Jacques) to the Edmonton area in 1859.

Main services
The Grey Nuns Community Hospital offers a wide range of services.
General and Vascular Surgery
Intensive and Cardiac Care
Family medicine 
internal medicine 
Children's Health
Women's Health
Diagnostics
Mental Health
Ambulatory Care

References

1988 establishments in Alberta
Certified airports in Alberta
Heliports in Canada
Hospital buildings completed in 1988
Catholic hospitals in North America
Hospitals established in 1988
Hospitals in Edmonton